Charlevoix Township is a civil township of Charlevoix County in the U.S. state of Michigan. The population was 1,645 at the 2010 census.

The township surrounds the city of Charlevoix in two segments along Lake Michigan and Lake Charlevoix, but the township and city are administered automously.

Communities
It was settled in 1893 with a train depot along the Chicago and Western Michigan Railroad. A post office spelled Belvidere opened June 20, 1893 but we respelled to Belvedere three weeks later. The community did not survive long, and the post office closed by the end of the same year on December 21.

Geography

Charlevoix Township is located along the shore of Lake Michigan and Lake Charlevoix, and it occupies two segments of land surrounding the city of Charlevoix. The northern portion of Fisherman's Island State Park is within the township.

Major highways
  runs north through both segments of the township and in and out of the city of Charlevoix.
  enters briefly through the southeast corner of the township and terminates at US 31 in the city of Charlevoix.
  is a county-designated highway that begins at US 31 and runs briefly though the northern segment of the township.
  is a county-designated highway that enters the southern segment of the township only briefly before ending at US 31 in the city of Charlevoix.

Demographics
As of the census of 2000, there were 1,697 people, 662 households, and 462 families residing in the township. The racial makeup of the township was 96.05% White, 0.71% African American, 1.53% Native American, 0.82% Asian, 0.18% Pacific Islander, 0.24% from other races, and 0.47% from two or more races. Hispanic or Latino of any race were 1.18% of the population.

There were 662 households, out of which 32.2% had children under the age of 18 living with them, 58.2% were married couples living together, 8.3% had a female householder with no husband present, and 30.2% were non-families. 25.5% of all households were made up of individuals, and 11.8% had someone living alone who was 65 years of age or older.  The average household size was 2.50 and the average family size was 2.98.

In the township the population was spread out, with 25.5% under the age of 18, 6.5% from 18 to 24, 24.2% from 25 to 44, 26.3% from 45 to 64, and 17.5% who were 65 years of age or older.  The median age was 41 years. For every 100 females, there were 94.2 males.  For every 100 females age 18 and over, there were 89.4 males.

The median income for a household in the township was $45,758, and the median income for a family was $51,250. Males had a median income of $40,263 versus $22,969 for females. The per capita income for the township was $22,835.  About 3.3% of families and 4.7% of the population were below the poverty line, including 4.1% of those under age 18 and 5.9% of those age 65 or over.

Education
Charlevoix Township is served entirely by Charlevoix Public Schools in the city of Charlevoix.

References

External links
Charlevoix Township official website

Townships in Charlevoix County, Michigan
Townships in Michigan
Michigan populated places on Lake Michigan